Pháp Hiền (died 626) was a Vietnamese Buddhist monk notable in the early history of Buddhism in Vietnam, Vietnamese Thiền or Chinese Chán Zen Buddhism in Vietnam.

Pháp Hiền studied under Quán Duyên, a Zen master at chùa Quán Vân, or Phap-van Temple, then under the Indian monk Vinītaruci. After the latter's death, Pháp Hiền built the Chúng Thiện pagoda at a mountain named Thiên Phúc or Tiên Du, northwest of Luy Lâu.

References

626 deaths
Vietnamese Buddhist monks
Year of birth unknown